The Tanaro,  is a  long river in northwestern Italy. The river begins in the Ligurian Alps, near the border with France, and is the most significant right-side tributary to the Po in terms of length, size of drainage basin (partly Alpine, partly Apennine), and discharge.

Geography

Sources
The Tanaro rises at the border between Piedmont and Liguria at the confluence of two smaller streams: the Tanarello and the Negrone.

The main source of the Tanarello is on the slopes of Monte Saccarello above Monesi, a village belonging to the commune of Triora. This mountain straddles the French département of Alpes-Maritimes, the Piedmontese province of Cuneo and the Ligurian province of Imperia and marks the juncture of the watersheds between three drainage basins: Tanaro itself; Roya, which rises in France but enters the sea at Ventimiglia; and Argentina, which flows into the Ligurian Sea at Taggia.

The sources of the Negrone are not far from Punta Marguareis and very close to the French border.

Course
The Tanaro flows through the towns of Ormea, Garessio, Ceva, Alba, Asti, and Alessandria before flowing into Po river near Bassignana  in the Province of Alessandria. At its confluence with Po, the Tanaro is about 50 km longer than the upper Po, a case similar to the famous Missouri tributary being longer than Mississippi in the United States.

Tributaries
The main tributaries to the Tanaro are the Stura di Demonte, the Pesio, the Ellero and the Borbore from the left and the Bormida and the Belbo from the right.

Regime
The flow is subject to a great seasonal variation. Although the river has an Alpine origin, which is unique among the Po’s right-side tributaries, the Ligurian Alps are of an insufficient elevation and too close to the sea to allow for the formation of snow fields or glaciers large enough to provide a steady source of water during the summer. Furthermore, the Alpine zone forms only a part of the basin drained by the Tanaro. The seasonal regime of the river is therefore more typical of an Apennine stream, with a maximum discharge that can reach ,  in spring and autumn and a very low rate of flow in the summer.

Flood events

The river is highly prone to flooding. During the two hundred-year period between 1801 and 2001, sections of the Tanaro basin were affected by floods on 136 occasions, the most devastating ones being in November 1994, November 2016, October 2020, when the whole valley was affected by severe flooding.

History
The left bank of the Tanaro River near Asti is the scene of the Battle of Pollentia on April 6, 402.

References
 The article draws on material from related articles in the Italian,  French and German Wikipedias, as retrieved  14 June 2006
  SUL MONTE SACCARELLO :: Una camminata alla scoperta delle sorgenti del Tanaro

 Luino F. (1999): “The  flood and landslide event  of  November 4–6, 1994  in Piedmont Region (North-West Italy): causes and related effects in Tanaro Valley”. XXII General Assembly dell’European Geophysical Society, Vienna (Austria). 21–25 April 1997. Ed. Elsevier Science Ltd, Vol. 24, N. 2, p. 123-129.

See also 
 List of rivers of Italy

 
Rivers of the Province of Imperia
Rivers of the Province of Cuneo
Rivers of the Province of Asti
Rivers of the Province of Alessandria
Rivers of Italy
Rivers of the Alps